Admiral Palliser may refer to:

Arthur Palliser (1890–1956), British Royal Navy admiral
Henry Palliser (1839–1907), British Royal Navy admiral
Hugh Palliser (1723–1796), British Royal Navy admiral